Archer is a 1985 Australian made-for-television western drama film about the true story of Archer, the first horse to win the Melbourne Cup and his 17-year-old strapper, Dave Power. Directed by Denny Lawrence, it was filmed in New South Wales' Sydney outskirts, Baulkham Hills, Megalong Valley and Snowy Mountains and Victoria's Melbourne.

Cast

 Brett Climo as Dave Power
 Robert Coleby as Etienne de Mestre
 Nicole Kidman as Catherine
 Tony Barry as Squatter
 Paul Bertram as Lord Alfred
 Anna-Maria Monticelli as Anna
 Ned Lander as Jack Curtis
 Doreen Warburton as Cook
 Claire Corbett as Maid
 Brian Anderson as Mailman
 John Spicer as Butler
 Robin Bowering as Mr Power
 Helen McDonald as Mrs Power
 Karyn Greig as Mrs de Mestre
 Bradey Meehan as Boy
 Shari Flood as Girl

References

External links
 

1985 films
1985 television films
1985 Western (genre) films
Australian Western (genre) films
Australian drama television films
Drama films based on actual events
Films about horses
Films set in colonial Australia
Films set in the 1860s
Films shot in Australia
Films scored by Chris Neal (songwriter)